Otto Speckter (9 November 1807, in Hamburg – 29 April 1871, in Hamburg) was a German etcher and illustrator.

Life and work 
He was the son of Johannes Michael Speckter, whose lithographic company he took over in 1834. His brother was the painter, Erwin Speckter. He initially made himself known through lithography, then began illustrating books with arabesques, vignettes and figure drawings.

He was married to Marie Auguste, née Bergeest (1824-1899). Their son, also became an illustrator, but died in a mental institution at an early age. There is an "Otto-Speckter-Straße" in the Hamburg district of Barmbek-Nord. He was interred in a family plot at Ohlsdorf Cemetery.

In 2019, his works were part of an exhibition; "Hamburger Schule – Das 19. Jahrhundert neu entdeckt", held at the Hamburger Kunsthalle.

Sources 
 Veronika Braunfels: Otto Speckter (1807–1871). Illustrator und Lithograph in Hamburg, Verein für Hamburgische Geschichte, Hamburg 1995, 
 Walter Hettche (Ed.): Theodor Storm – Otto Speckter, Theodor Storm – Hans Speckter. Briefwechsel, Erich Schmidt, Berlin 1991, 
 
 
 Hamburgisches Künstler-Lexikon Vol. 1, Hoffmann und Campe, Hamburg 1854, pg.243 (Online Hamburg Staats- und Universitätsbibliothek

External links 

 
 The Brothers and Sisters of Grimm's Tales; in illustrations by Otto Speckter

1807 births
1871 deaths
German lithographers
German etchers
German illustrators
Artists from Hamburg